The Old Hickory Lake Arboretum is an arboretum and environmental study area located adjacent to Old Hickory Lake in Hendersonville, Tennessee.

The arboretum contains over 60 species of shrubs and trees. It was created and is maintained by the United States Army Corps of Engineers, who manage the lake area.

See also
 List of botanical gardens and arboretums in the United States

Arboreta in Tennessee
Botanical gardens in Tennessee
Protected areas of Sumner County, Tennessee